Andrei Dan Bozeșan (born 12 February 1988) is a Romanian former footballer who played as a midfielder for teams such as: Gloria Bistrița, Forex Brașov, Gaz Metan Mediaș and Săgeata Năvodari.

External links
 
 

1988 births
Living people
Sportspeople from Bistrița
Romanian footballers
Association football midfielders
Liga I players
ACF Gloria Bistrița players
CS Gaz Metan Mediaș players
AFC Săgeata Năvodari players
21st-century Romanian people